Irving Clinton Higginbotham (April 26, 1882 – June 13, 1959) was an American professional baseball pitcher in Major League Baseball from 1906 to 1909. He played for the St. Louis Cardinals and Chicago Cubs.

Higginbotham was born on April 26, 1881, in Blyburg, Nebraska. He made his MLB debut on August 11, 1906, with the St. Louis Cardinals. His professional baseball career ended in 1909.  Later in life, he worked as a painter; he was a member of Painter Union 300 in Seattle.  Higginbotham died of a heart ailment in Seattle on June 13, 1959, and was buried in Acacia Memorial Park in King County, Washington.

References

External links

1882 births
1959 deaths
Major League Baseball pitchers
St. Louis Cardinals players
Chicago Cubs players
Tacoma Tigers players
Aberdeen Black Cats players
Louisville Colonels (minor league) players
Monmouth Browns players
Toledo Mud Hens players
Portland Beavers players
Des Moines Boosters players
Oakland Oaks (baseball) players
Baseball players from Nebraska
People from Dakota County, Nebraska